Trout Brook is a stream in Ramsey County, in the U.S. state of Minnesota. It source is at McCarrons Lake.

Nature Sanctuary
The Trout Brook Nature Sanctuary is part of the Trout Brook Greenway and is located on  a 42 acre site west of I-35E between Norpac Rd. and Cayuga Ave.

Trout Brook was buried during development in St. Paul and later unearthed and routed as a stream.

There are also Trout Brooks in Pine, Dakota, Wabasha, and Washington Counties, Minnesota.

See also
List of rivers of Minnesota

References

Rivers of Ramsey County, Minnesota
Rivers of Minnesota